Coptobrycon bilineatus is a species of characin endemic to Brazil, where it is found in the upper Tietê River basin.  It is the only member of its genus.  It is found in freshwater environments at benthopelagic depths. This species is native to a tropical climate.

C. bilineatus grows to 4.1 cm (1.6 in) in length as an unsexed male.  It is distributed in the Upper Tietê River basin.

References

Notes
 

Characidae
Monotypic freshwater fish genera
Fish of South America
Fish of Brazil
Endemic fauna of Brazil
Taxa named by Marion Durbin Ellis
Fish described in 1911